The 1974–75 Cleveland Cavaliers season was the fifth season of the franchise in the National Basketball Association (NBA).

Draft picks

Roster

Regular season

Record vs. opponents

Game log

|-style="background:#cfc;"
| 5 || October 24, 1974 || @ Atlanta
| W 116–97
|
|
|
| The Omni4,147
| 2–3

|-style="background:#cfc;"
| 31 || December 29, 1974 || Atlanta
| W 110–103
|
|
|
| Coliseum at Richfield6,670
| 18–13

|-style="background:#fcc;"
| 36 || January 7, 1975 || @ Atlanta
| L 112–113 (OT)
|
|
|
| The Omni2,973
| 20–16

|-style="background:#cfc;"
| 49 || February 1, 1975 || Atlanta
| W 112–109 (OT)
|
|
|
| Coliseum at Richfield4,831
| 23–26
|-style="background:#fcc;"
| 51 || February 4, 1975 || @ Atlanta
| L 97–111
|
|
|
| The Omni2,758
| 24–27
|-style="background:#cfc;"
| 61 || February 23, 1975 || Atlanta
| W 111–105 (OT)
|
|
|
| Coliseum at Richfield8,777
| 32–29

|-style="background:#fcc;"
| 80 || March 29, 1975 || @ Atlanta
| L 97–103
|
|
|
| The Omni4,542
| 39–41

References

Cleveland
Cleveland Cavaliers seasons
Cleveland
Cleveland